Hulger is a British company that designs electronic equipment. It was formed from Pokia after a trademark dispute with Nokia by Nicolas Roope and Michael-George Hemus.

The company founded on the idea of old telephone handsets plugged into cellphones but soon diversified, adding voice over IP applications. Whilst Pokia handsets were modded existing designs, Hulger handsets are newly commissioned products, created specially for use. In late 2005 two Bluetooth models allowed wireless use with both cellphones and PCs/Macs.

The company founded in London, England in 2005 after extensive media coverage of its previous incarnation Pokia, a prototype project dating back to its inception in 2002. The first production model was available to buy on 1 June 2005, and since then a number of new designs have launched under the label. 

Hulger products have received both Gmark and IF product design awards and have featured in The New York Times, Vogue, Elle, ICON, The Times, Engadget, Gizmodo, Surface, Nylon, Marie Claire, Wallpaper*, The Boston Globe, and the Pappa*Phone was included in GQ US' products of the year in 2008. 

In 2007 Hulger launched the Plumen project, an alternative design concept challenging the lack of diversity in CFL, or low-energy light bulbs. The project proposes that by making more interesting and attractive bulb shapes out of the tubular formation of the CFL bulb people will be much more likely to buy and use them.

The first Plumen concept and working prototype of the CFL bulb was included in MoMA New York's permanent design collection in 2008. Another Plumen prototype featured in the V&A, London's "In Praise Of Shadows" exhibition in 2009.

The Plumen 001 "designer energy-saving light bulb" was launched in London and Seattle on 10 September 2010. The product is available as a standard fit light bulb, benefits from low energy consumption but is more decorative than conventional CFLs / low-energy light bulbs.

External links
 Hulger.com

Design companies of the United Kingdom